is a Japanese actor and politician of the Constitutional Democratic Party of Japan (CDP), a member of the House of Representatives in the National Diet (national legislature).

Overviews 
A native of Usa, Ōita and graduate of the University of Kitakyushu, he was elected to the House of Representatives for the first time in 1993 as an independent. He later joined the Social Democratic Party and then Democratic Party of Japan. In 2011, he assumed the office of Senior Vice-Minister of the Environment. After General Election 2012, which he lost the seat, he announced his retirement from politics and return to the entertainment industry. Shin Godzilla in which he played the role of Minister of the Environment is one of the most major movies after his return.

He made a comeback to politics in 2017. He joined the CDP prior to the 2017 general election and subsequently ran in his former Oita 3rd district seat. He was defeated by the incumbent Takeshi Iwaya by a majority of 15,279 votes, but was elected in the proportional representation block.

References

External links 
 Official profile in Japanese.

1943 births
Living people
People from Ōita Prefecture
Japanese male actors
Japanese actor-politicians
Members of the House of Representatives (Japan)
Constitutional Democratic Party of Japan politicians
Democratic Party of Japan politicians
Social Democratic Party (Japan) politicians
21st-century Japanese politicians